Lithium was a French indie rock label, founded by Vincent Chauvier in the early 1990s. It ceased to exist in 2004.

Some artists 

 Dominique A
 Françoiz Breut
 Diabologum

References 

Record labels established in 1990
French record labels
Indie rock record labels
Defunct record labels of France